Rosina was launched in Norway in  1807. She was wrecked in November 1810.

Career
Rosina first appeared in Lloyd's Register in 1808.

On 3 September 1808 Rosina, Brodig, master, arrived at Gothenburg from Plymouth. Then on 10 November she was on shore near Whitstable as she was sailing for Plymouth with a load of timber. She had struck on a sandbank but boats had pulled her off. On 21 July she resumed her voyage to Plymouth. As she was not taking on much water it was believed that she had not suffered material damage. On 1 December she arrived at Weymouth on her way from Gothenburg to Plymouth, together with some other vessels that had lost their cables and anchors in the Downs.

Fate
Rosina, Samuelson, master, from North America, was driven ashore at Ballyrattan Bay, near Cork, in November 1810 and was expected to go to pieces.

Citations

1807 ships
Ships built in Norway
Age of Sail merchant ships of England
Maritime incidents in 1808
Maritime incidents in 1810